Diocletian is a New Zealand extreme metal band from Auckland. Formed in 2004, the band split in 2015. Its lineup then featured Brendan Southwell (also known as Atrociter and B.S.) (guitar, vocals), L. Muir (guitar, vocals, bass), C. Sinclair (drums) and J. Baldwin (guitars). The band's 2015 album, Gesundrian, was featured as number 15 on Pitchfork's list of "The Best Metal Albums of 2014".

Brendan Southwell reactivated the band in 2016 with a whole new line-up. In 2018, Diocletian members are B.S. at lead guitar, E. M. at drums, and R.W. (Rigel Walshe from Dawn of Azazel) at bass. Impurath, from the American act Black Witchery takes lead vocal duty when available as C.T.

Band members
Current members
 B.S. – guitar, vocals (2004–2015, 2016–)
R.W. - bass (2017–)
E.M. - drums (2017–)
C.T. - vocals (2016–)

Former members
 L. Muir – guitar (2004–2008), vocals (2004–2008, 2011–2015), bass (2011–2015)
 C. Sinclair – drums (2006–2015)
 J. Baldwin – guitars (2011–2014, 2015)
 K. Stanley – vocals, bass
 A. Craft – drums (2004–2005)
 V. Kusabs – guitar, bass, vocals (2006–2010)
 S. Bidwell – guitar (2015)

Discography
Studio albums
 Doom Cult (2009)
 Bellum Omnium Contra Omnes (subsequently reissued as War of All Against All) (2010)
 Gesundrian (2014)
 Amongst the Flames of a Burning God (2019)

EPs and splits
 Decimator (2007)
 Chaos Rising (2008)
 Sect of Swords (2008)
 European Annihilation (2012)
 Disciples of War (2012, with Weregoat)
 Darkness Swallows All (2021)

Compilations
 Annihilation Rituals (2012)

Demos
 Demo 1: 2005 (2005)

References

External links
 

New Zealand black metal musical groups
New Zealand death metal musical groups
Musical groups established in 2004
Musical groups disestablished in 2015
Musical quartets